John Henry (Maryland politician) (1750–1798) was a U.S. Senator from Maryland from 1789 to 1797. Senator Henry may also refer to:

Brad Henry (born 1963), Oklahoma State Senate
Charles L. Henry (1849–1927), Indiana State Senate
Daniel Maynadier Henry (1823–1899), Maryland State Senate
Douglas Henry (1926–2017), Tennessee State Senate
E. Stevens Henry (1836–1921), Connecticut State Senate
John Henry (representative) (1800–1882), Illinois State Senate
Margaret Rose Henry (born 1944), Delaware State Senate
Morriss Henry (born 1931), Arkansas State Senate
Pat Henry (politician) (1861–1933), Mississippi State Senate
Paul B. Henry (1942–1993), Michigan State Senate
William Wirt Henry (1831–1900), Virginia State Senate